The Science Subcommittee on Investigations and Oversight is one of five subcommittees of the United States House Committee on Science and Technology. This subcommittee is responsible for general and special investigative and oversight authority on all matters within the jurisdiction of the Committee on Science and Technology, including those matters covered by the other subcommittees.

Members, 117th Congress

Historical membership rosters

115th Congress

116th Congress

External links
 Subcommittee on Investigations and Oversight, official website
 Republican Subcommittee website

Science Investigations